Mazang or Mezang may refer to:
 Mazang, Razavi Khorasan
 Mezang, Yazd